Oxynoemacheilus is a genus of fish in the family Nemacheilidae found in Europe and Western Asia.

Species
There are currently 51 recognized species in this genus:

References

Freshwater fish genera
Nemacheilidae
Taxa named by Petre Mihai Bănărescu
Taxa named by Teodor T. Nalbant